Charles Earl Rickart (1913 – 17 April 2002) was an American mathematician, known for Rickart spaces.
 
Rickart was born in Osage City, Kansas, and earned his B.A. and M.A. from the University of Kansas. In 1941 he received his PhD from the University of Michigan under Theophil Henry Hildebrandt with thesis Integration in a Convex Linear Topological Space. Rickart was for two years the Benjamin Pierce Instructor at Harvard University. He joined the Yale mathematics faculty in 1943, served as chair of the department from 1959 to 1965, became the first Percey F. Smith Professor of Mathematics in 1963, and retired in 1983.

Rickart did research on Banach algebras and was the author of three books. In the late 1950s and early 1960s he was one of the pioneers in introducing the "new math" into American schools. His doctoral students include Samuel Merrill III.

He died in North Branford, Connecticut where he lived, survived by his wife, Annabel Erickson Rickart, three sons, and four grandchildren.

Works
;

See also
Baer ring

References

External links 
search on author Charles Rickart from Google Scholar

1913 births
2002 deaths
20th-century American mathematicians
Mathematical analysts
People from Osage City, Kansas
University of Kansas alumni
University of Michigan alumni
Yale University faculty
Functional analysts
People from North Branford, Connecticut